Kirill Anatolyevich Karpov (born 28 February 1997) is a Russian football player who plays for Molodechno.

Club career
He made his debut in the Russian Football National League for FC Shinnik Yaroslavl on 15 April 2018 in a game against FC Orenburg.

References

External links
 Profile by Russian Football National League
 
 
 Profile at Crimean Football Union

1997 births
Sportspeople from Arkhangelsk Oblast
Living people
Russian footballers
Russian expatriate footballers
Association football defenders
FC Shinnik Yaroslavl players
FC Orsha players
FC Volga Ulyanovsk players
FC Lida players
FC Yevpatoriya players
FC Molodechno players
Russian expatriate sportspeople in Belarus
Expatriate footballers in Belarus
Crimean Premier League players